Stanislas Wawrinka was the defending champion, but withdrew before the event started.
Carlos Berlocq won the title, defeating Tomáš Berdych in the final, 0–6, 7–5, 6–1.

Seeds
The top four seeds receive a bye into the second round.

 Tomáš Berdych (final)
 Milos Raonic (quarterfinals)
 Marcel Granollers (quarterfinals)
 Guillermo García López (second round)
 Dmitry Tursunov (first round)
 João Sousa (first round)
 Teymuraz Gabashvili (first round)
 Mikhail Kukushkin (first round)

Draw

Finals

Top half

Bottom half

Qualifying

Seeds

 Leonardo Mayer (qualified)
 Daniel Gimeno Traver (qualified)
 Radu Albot (qualified)
 Taro Daniel (qualified)
 Roberto Carballés Baena (qualifying competition, lucky loser)
 Niels Desein (qualifying competition)
 Jordi Samper Montaña (qualifying competition)
 Victor Crivoi (qualifying competition)

Qualifiers

  Leonardo Mayer
  Daniel Gimeno Traver
  Radu Albot
  Taro Daniel

Lucky losers
  Roberto Carballés Baena

Qualifying draw

First qualifier

Second qualifier

Third qualifier

Fourth qualifier

References
 Main Draw
 Qualifying Draw

Men's Singles